Petrophile pauciflora is a species of flowering plant in the family Proteaceae and is endemic to western areas of Western Australia. It is a shrub usually with three-forked leaves, the lobes sharply-pointed, and spherical heads of small groups of hairy yellow or orange flowers.

Description

Taxonomy
Petrophile pauciflora was first formally described in 1995 by Donald Bruce Foreman in Flora of Australia from material collected by Alex George near Bimbijy Station in 1976. The specific epithet (pauciflora) means "few-flowered".

Distribution and habitat
This petrophile grows in low, open heathland on breakaway areas in a few locations in the Avon Wheatbelt, Murchison and Yalgoo biogeographic regions of Western Australia.

Conservation status
Petrophile pauciflora is classified as "Priority Three" by the Government of Western Australia Department of Parks and Wildlife meaning that it is poorly known and known from only a few locations but is not under imminent threat.

References

pauciflora
Eudicots of Western Australia
Endemic flora of Western Australia
Plants described in 1995